1968 riots  may refer to:

 Orangeburg massacre, February 8, South Carolina State University, Orangeburg, South Carolina
 King assassination riots, April and May, across the United States, including: 
 1968 Washington, D.C., riots, April 4–8, Washington, D.C.
 1968 Chicago riots (West Side Riots), April 5–7, Chicago, Illinois
 Baltimore riot of 1968, April 6–12, Baltimore, Maryland
 Avondale, Cincinnati#Riots of 1968, April 8, Cincinnati, Ohio
 1968 Kansas City, Missouri riot, April 9, Kansas City, Missouri
 Wilmington riot of 1968, April 9–10, Wilmington, Delaware
 1968 Louisville riots, May 27–29, Louisville, Kentucky
 May 1968 civil unrest and student riots in France
 Glenville shootout, July 23–28, Cleveland, Ohio
 1968 Democratic National Convention protest activity, August 1968, Chicago, Illinois